Korean diplomatic missions may refer to:

Diplomatic missions of North Korea
Diplomatic missions of South Korea